The Atlantic Test Range is a test range of the United States Navy that extends from New Jersey to North Carolina.

References

External links
Image of the range

United States Navy installations
Military installations in New Jersey
Military installations in Maryland
Military installations in Virginia
Military installations in Delaware
Military installations in North Carolina